Jurgis Jurgelis (born 9 August 1942 in Šiauliai, Generalbezirk Litauen, Reichskommissariat Ostland) is a mathematics teacher, politician, and signatory of the 1990 Act of the Re-Establishment of the State of Lithuania.

References

1942 births
Living people
People from Šiauliai
Lithuanian politicians
Members of the Seimas